The 1940 Washington Senators won 64 games, lost 90, and finished in seventh place in the American League. They were managed by Bucky Harris and played home games at Griffith Stadium.

Regular season

Season standings

Record vs. opponents

Notable transactions 
 May 18, 1940: Willis Hudlin was signed as a free agent by the Senators.

Roster

Player stats

Batting

Starters by position 
Note: Pos = Position; G = Games played; AB = At bats; H = Hits; Avg. = Batting average; HR = Home runs; RBI = Runs batted in

Other batters 
Note: G = Games played; AB = At bats; H = Hits; Avg. = Batting average; HR = Home runs; RBI = Runs batted in

Pitching

Starting pitchers 
Note: G = Games pitched; IP = Innings pitched; W = Wins; L = Losses; ERA = Earned run average; SO = Strikeouts

Other pitchers 
Note: G = Games pitched; IP = Innings pitched; W = Wins; L = Losses; ERA = Earned run average; SO = Strikeouts

Relief pitchers 
Note: G = Games pitched; W = Wins; L = Losses; SV = Saves; ERA = Earned run average; SO = Strikeouts

Farm system 

LEAGUE CHAMPIONS: OrlandoNewport (TN) club played in Maryville (TN), July 31 to August 11, 1940; Shelby club folded, July 19

Notes

References 
1940 Washington Senators at Baseball-Reference
1940 Washington Senators team page at www.baseball-almanac.com

Minnesota Twins seasons
Washington Senators season
Washington